Van de Kamp's Holland Dutch Bakeries was a brand of breads and assorted pastry products, frozen fish entrees, and prepared dinners formerly owned by General Baking Established by one of the founders of both Los Angeles' iconic Tam O'Shanter Inn and the Lawry's restaurant chain and seasoned salt empire, it went bankrupt in 1990.

History
Van de Kamp's Holland Dutch Bakeries was founded in 1915 as a Los Angeles potato chip stand by Theodore J. Van de Kamp, his sisters Marian and Henrietta, and Henrietta's husband Lawrence L. Frank, all recent transplants from Milwaukee, Wisconsin.  The first stand was operated from an eight foot frontage at 236 ½ South Spring Street adjacent to the Saddle Rock Café—the very heart of Los Angeles at the time. They expanded the business to baked goods, and by the mid-1950s had become a regional bakery/restaurant chain. At the company’s height, 320 Van de Kamp’s Holland Dutch Bakers dotted the West Coast from California to Washington. In 1930 the company built a large bakery and administrative offices to support its growth in Glassell Park, Los Angeles. The Van de Kamp Bakery Building was designed by New York architect J. Edwin Hopkins. The company's trademark blue windmills featured on their bakery store signs and atop their chain of restaurants that were known throughout the region. Its slogan was to capitalize on the association with Dutch cleanliness and freshness: "Made Clean, Kept Clean, Sold Clean". Following the death of Theodore van de Kamp in 1956, the bakery was acquired by General Baking Co. The company was sold to private investors in 1979, and closed in bankruptcy in 1990. Today, there are few remnants the famous windmills. A former Van de Kamp Holland Dutch bakery in Arcadia, CA was converted to a Denny's restaurant in 1989 and still features a fully restored windmill.

Former Los Angeles County District Attorney (1975–81) and State Attorney General (1983–91), John K. Van de Kamp (D) is a nephew of the baker's co-founders. Under the direction of Lawrence (Larry) Frank, the Frank and Van de Kamp families also founded Lawry's Restaurants and the Tam O'Shanter Inn.

Over the years the Van de Kamp brand had been owned by Pillsbury, Pet, Inc., Van De Kamp's, Inc., and later Aurora Foods.

Several former employees of the bakery were interviewed, and the original bakery featured, in Visiting... with Huell Howser Episode 802.

The Van de Kamp's brand is now owned by Pinnacle Foods, Inc.  The Van de Kamp's brand is also used by Ralphs and sister company Food 4 Less supermarket chains for their line of private-label baked goods.

See also
 List of bakeries

Images

References

Bakeries of California
Companies that filed for Chapter 11 bankruptcy in 1990
Defunct restaurants in Los Angeles
Defunct companies based in Greater Los Angeles
Kroger